EIF may refer to:

Science and medicine 
 Echogenic intracardiac focus
 Eukaryotic initiation factor
 Exponential integrate-and-fire

Sport 
 Edsbyns IF, a Swedish bandy club
 Ekenäs IF, a Finnish football club
 Eskilsminne IF, Swedish football club

Other uses 
 Easter Island Foundation, an American conservation organization
 Eclaireurs israélites de France, a French Scouting organization
 Edinburgh International Festival, a Scottish performing arts festival
 Empirical influence function
 Enhanced integrated framework, a global development program
 Enterprise interoperability framework
 Entertainment Industry Foundation, an American entertainment industry charity
 European industry federation, a type of trade union
 European Internet Foundation of the European Parliament
 European Interoperability Framework
 European Investment Fund, an agency of the European Union